A wrecking yard (Australian, New Zealand, and Canadian English), scrapyard (Irish, British and New Zealand English) or junkyard (American English) is the location of a business in dismantling where wrecked or decommissioned vehicles are brought, their usable parts are sold for use in operating vehicles, while the unusable metal parts, known as scrap metal parts, are sold to metal-recycling companies. Other terms include wreck yard, wrecker's yard, salvage yard, breaker's yard, dismantler and scrapheap. In the United Kingdom, car salvage yards are known as car breakers, while motorcycle salvage yards are known as bike breakers. In Australia, they are often referred to as 'Wreckers'.

Types of wreck yards

The most common type of wreck yards are automobile wreck yards, but junkyards for motorcycles, bicycles, trucks, buses, small airplanes and boats or trains exist too.

Scrapyard
A scrapyard is a recycling center that buys and sells scrap metal. Scrapyards are effectively a scrap metal brokerage. Scrapyards typically buy any base metal; for example, iron, steel, stainless steel, brass, copper, aluminum, zinc, nickel, and lead would all be found at a modern-day scrapyard. Scrapyards will often buy electronics, appliances, and metal vehicles. Scrapyards will sell their accumulations of metals either to refineries or larger scrap brokers. Metal theft is committed so thieves can sell stolen copper or other stolen valuable metals to scrapyards.

Operation

When an automobile is severely damaged, has malfunctioned beyond repair, or is not worth the repair, the owner may sell it to a junkyard. In some cases, when the car has become disabled in a place where derelict cars are not allowed to be left, the car owner will pay the wrecker to haul the car away. Salvage yards also buy most of the wrecked, derelict, and abandoned vehicles that are sold at auction from police impound storage lots, and often buy vehicles from insurance tow yards as well. The salvage yard will usually tow the vehicle from the location of its purchase to the yard, but occasionally vehicles are driven in. At the salvage yard, the automobiles are typically arranged in rows, often stacked on top of one another. Some yards keep inventories in their offices, as to the usable parts in each car, as well as the car's location in the yard. Many yards have computerized inventory systems. About 75% of any given vehicle can be recycled and used for other goods.

In recent years it is becoming increasingly common to use satellite part finder services to contact multiple salvage yards from a single source. In the 20th century, these were call centres that charged a premium rate for calls and compiled a facsimile that was sent to various salvage yards so they could respond directly if the part was in stock. Many of these are now Web-based with requests for parts being e-mailed instantly. 

Often parts for which there is high demand are removed from cars and brought to the salvage yard's warehouse. Then a customer who asks for a specific part can obtain it immediately, without having to wait for the salvage yard employees to remove that part. Some salvage yards expect customers to remove the part themselves (known as "self-service yards"), or allow this at a substantially reduced price compared to having the junkyard's staff remove it.  This style of the yard is often referred to as a "You Pull It" yard.

However, it is more common for a customer to call in and inquire whether the specific item they need is available. If the yard has the requested item, the customer is usually instructed to leave a deposit and to come to pick up the part at a later time. The part is usually installed by the customer or agent ("the customer's mechanic"); however, some salvage yards also provide installation services.

The parts usually dismantled from automobiles are generally any that can be resold such as the light assemblies (commonly known as just "lights", e.g. headlights, blinkers, taillights), seats, parts of the exhaust system, mirrors, hubcaps, etc. Late-model vehicles will often have entire halves or portions of the body removed and stored on shelves as inventory. Other major parts such as the engine and transmission are often removed and sold, usually to auto-parts companies that will rebuild the part and resell it with a warranty, or will sell the components as-is in used condition, either with or without warranty. Other, usually very large, junkyards will rebuild and sell such parts themselves. Unbroken windshields and windows may also be removed intact and resold to car owners needing replacements. Some salvage yards will sell damaged or wrecked, but repairable vehicles to amateur car builders, or older vehicles to collectors, who will restore ("rebuild") the car for their own use or entertainment, or sometimes for resale. These people are known as "rebuilders".

Once vehicles in a wrecking yard do not have more usable parts, the hulks are usually sold to a scrap-metal processor, who will usually crush the bodies on-site at the yard's premises using a mobile baling press, shredder, or flattener, with final disposal occurring within a hammer mill which smashes the vehicle remains into fist-sized chunks. These chunks are then sold by multiple tons for further processing and recycling.

Gallery

See also
Historischer Autofriedhof Gürbetal, Swiss wrecking yard which resembles a museum
Vehicle graveyard
Vehicle recycling
Victory Auto Wreckers

Bibliography
 Junkyards, Gearheads and Rust, salvaging the automotive past, David N. Lucsko, Johns Hopkins University Press, 2016

References

External links
10 Surprising Junkyard Finds
Junkyards Near Me Search

Recycling industry
Vehicle recycling
Waste collection